"Is It Still Over?" is a song co-written by Ken Bell and Larry Henley and recorded by American country music artist Randy Travis. It was released in January 1989 as the third single from his album, Old 8x10. The single was his ninth as well as his seventh consecutive number 1 hit in the United States. It peaked at number 1 on both the Billboard Hot Country Singles & Tracks chart and the Canadian RPM country Tracks chart.  This song was also featured in National Treasure: Book of Secrets in the scene at Mount Vernon.

Chart performance

Year-end charts

References

1989 singles
1988 songs
Randy Travis songs
Songs written by Larry Henley
Song recordings produced by Kyle Lehning
Warner Records singles
Songs written by Ken Bell (songwriter)